Tasos Diakogiorgis (Greek: Τάσος Διακογιώργης; 1924 – 12 March 2007) was a Greek virtuoso santurist and music teacher. He is regarded as one of the greatest Greek santurists of all time.

Biography 
Tasos Diakogiorgis was born in 1924 in Maritsa, a village of Rhodes. At the age of 10, began to study music and from 1939 to 1941 was attending violin lessons at the National Conservatory of Rhodes.

In 1954 moved to Athens to participate at the Dora Stratou Greek Dances Theatre as a soloist and study percussion and classical music theory with Manolis Kalomiris and Leonidas Zoras.

In 1962 Nikos Koundouros introduced him to Yannis Markopoulos. After this, he became a member of the ensemble that recorded the music of the film Young Aphrodites.

In 1964 he acceded to the ERT Contemporary Music Orchestra and ERT National Symphony Orchestra subsequently, which he remained until 1989.

Diakogiorgis died on 12 March 2007, in Athens.

References 

1924 births
2007 deaths
20th-century Greek musicians
20th-century Greek educators
Greek musicians
People from Rhodes